David H. Mincberg is a lawyer and former executive that has worked for the Detroit Pistons, Milwaukee Bucks, Memphis Grizzlies (National Basketball Association), and D.C. United (Major League Soccer).

Biography
Mincberg spent one season as Assistant General Manager of the Pistons. Prior to joining the Pistons, Mincberg was Vice President of Basketball Strategy for the Milwaukee Bucks.  Bucks General Manager Jon Horst described Mincberg as "a very creative thinker" that "built out a department that not a lot of if any teams really had, and really created a department with him and he killed it." Pistons General Manager Troy Weaver hired Mincberg in July 2020 as "something of a jack of all trades" with experience ranging "from scouting to analytics to salary-cap management to legal counsel." 

Mincberg has a Juris Doctor from the University of California, Berkeley, School of Law and worked on the acquisitions of both the Memphis Grizzlies and D.C. United (Major League Soccer) before serving as the in-house counsel for both organizations. In his capacity as team counsel for D.C. United, Mincberg was tasked with negotiating a deal to secure a new stadium for D.C. United, which would allow the franchise to remain in D.C.  In July 2013, after working closely with City Administrator Allen Lew, Mincberg helped DC United strike a deal with the city of Washington, D.C. that was heralded as "likely to give (the) franchise the kick it needs." In his capacity as team counsel for the Memphis Grizzlies, Mincberg was involved with the team's business operations, basketball operations, and ownership group. He also played an active role in the team's player personnel decisions, draft process, and scouting.

Mincberg has also contributed to the field of Sports Law through his writing. His article, "Guns, Collective Bargaining and Moral Turpitude: Gilbert Arenas and the National Basketball Association" examined the standards by which the NBA assesses moral turpitude and whether Gilbert Arenas' contract could have been terminated on such grounds in the wake of his decision to bring a gun into the Washington Wizards' locker room. Mincberg's scholarship has recently been cited by Westlaw's treatise "The Fundamentals of Sports Law".

Mincberg was relieved of his duties as Assistant GM by the Pistons in June 2021. 

Mincberg is a native of Washington, D.C. He holds a bachelor's degree from the University of South Florida.

References

Memphis Grizzlies executives
D.C. United non-playing staff